Eduardo Mendúa Vargas (c. 1983 – 26th February 2023) was an Ecuadorian indigenous leader, environmentalist, and land rights activist from the Cofán community who campaigned against oil drilling in Dureno, a Cofán village in Sucumbíos Province within the Amazon basin. On 26 February 2023, Mendúa was shot dead outside his home.

Activism 
Between 2010 and 2016, Mendúa served two terms as president of the Dureno Cofán community. He later became a member of the Confederation of Indigenous Nationalities of Ecuador (Spanish: Confederación de Nacionalidades Indígenas del Ecuador, or CONAIE), and served as its director of international relationships from 2021 until his death.

The ancestral lands of the Cofán people are located in close to proximity to Nueva Loja, the administrative capital of Sucumbíos Province and a major centre of oil operations in Ecuador. Petroecuador, the national oil company of Ecuador, announced plans to expand its operations east of Nueva Loja, including building 30 oil wells along the banks of the Aguarico river which overlapped with Cofán land. In 2016, Silverio Criollo, Mendúa's successor as president of the Dureno Cofán community, began negotiating with Petroecuador to build oil wells on Cofán land, and was alleged to have sanctioned community members who opposed this. Mendúa, alongside around 130 other local campaigners, led road blocks preventing Petroecuador personnel from entering Dureno and other Cofán villages along the river. As a member of CONAIE, Mendúa criticised the Ecuadorian government for failing to consult with local communities about planned oil extraction on indigenous lands, in accordance with the 2008 constitution. He later warned that the expansion of oil drilling in Sucumbíos Province would lead to the "extermination" of the Cofán people.

In the days before his murder, Mendúa took part in a strike led by members of the Kichwa community in El Edén, protesting Petroecuador's failure to comply with commitments it had made in relation to existing oil wells on indigenous lands. Two days before his death, CONAIE called for a national strike against the Ecuadorian government for breaking its promise not to expand drilling operations on indigenous lands at a council meeting in Quito.

Assassination and aftermath 
On 26th February 2023, Mendúa was shot dead in the garden of his home in Dureno by two people dressed in hoods, who subsequently escaped via speedboat; Mendúa's wife, who was with him at the time, was not harmed. An autopsy of Mendúa found he had been shot twelve times, and identified his cause of death as being haemorrhaging and cerebral lacerations caused by being shot with a firearm. Mendúa's funeral was held on 28th February 2023, and was streamed by CONAIE.

Hours after Mendúa's death, officers from the National Police conducted raids that resulted in the seizing of firearms and the arrest of a suspect alleged to have driven the speedboat Mendúa's killers fled on. The suspect, named only as David Q., remains remanded in police custody. A judge granted Mendúa's wife and children a protection order following his murder. Juan Zapata, the Minister of the Interior, has alleged that Mendúa's killers were from within the Cofán community, and that the murder stemmed from an internal dispute over support for oil drilling in Cofán lands. It has been alleged that Silverio Criollo, the president of the Dureno Cofán community, ordered the killing. On 28th February 2023, CONAIE called for Criollo's council to be revoked, and for their agreement with Petroecuador to be revoked.

Mendúa's death occurred almost two years after the killing of his brother Lino; as of 27th February 2023, Lino's death remains unsolved.

Response 
Guillermo Lasso, the President of Ecuador, released a statement in which he promised Mendúa's murder would not go unpunished. CONAIE's president, Leonidas Iza Salazar, condemned Mendúa's death, and blamed both Lasso and Petroeducador as being responsible, citing ongoing conflict in the area over oil drilling. Andrés Arauz, a former presidential candidate for the Citizen Revolution Movement who came second to Lasso in the 2021 presidential election, expressed his solidarity with Mendúa's family, as well as with CONAIE. The United Nations Special Rapporteur on the Rights of Indigenous Peoples, José Francisco Calí Tzay, expressed sadness at Mendúa's killing, and called on the Ecuadorian government to commit to a swift investigation to bring the murderers to justice. Speaking at a conference of Catholic bishops in Quito, Rafael Cob, president of the Pan-Amazonian Ecclesial Network and Apostolic Vicar of Puyo, said "we raise our voices denouncing this murder and asking for justice".

Personal life 
Mendúa was married to Fabiola Ortiz, with whom he had six children.

References 

1980s births
Year of birth uncertain
2023 deaths
Assassinated Ecuadorian people
Deaths by firearm in Ecuador
Ecuadorian human rights activists
Ecuadorian environmentalists
Ecuadorian people of indigenous peoples descent
Indigenous activists of the Americas
Indigenous rights activists
People from Sucumbíos Province
People murdered in Ecuador
Environmental killings
Land defender
2020s murders in Ecuador